The Akaflieg München Mü6 is a glider aircraft that was designed and built in Germany in 1924.

Development 
In 1931 Akaflieg München students Egon Scheibe and Victor Urban designed the Akaflieg München Mü6 to investigate Aero-towing, the new art of launching gliders. To ensure easy handling during tow, the aircraft was made light and robust (of fabric-covered-wood construction), with good handling characteristics. A strut-supported high-mounted wing was fitted on a rhomboidal section fuselage and a conventional empennage.

The  Mü6 survived until at least 1934 when it was noted that total flight time was 23 hours which includes the time taken for Egon Scheibe to fly his 105 km flight to Regensburg in 1933.

Specifications (Mü6)

References

1930s German sailplanes
Mu06
Parasol-wing aircraft
Aircraft first flown in 1931